Sudeshna Swayamprabha is a Bangladeshi dancer. She dances and choreographs classical dances such as Manipuri, Bharatnatyam and Kathak. She learnt dance from Amala Shankar and her mother Sharmila Banerjee.

Career 
She participated in the 2003 Kalidas Festival in India, where she performed in “Chitrangada”. She has also won first place in a dance competition on BTV, titled “Tarana”. She has danced internationally in countries like Dubai, Norway and Sri Lanka.

Teaching
She has formed her own dance academy called Nritya Nandan where she teaches dance.

References

Bangladeshi female dancers
Bangladeshi choreographers